Mount Lloyd Jones is a mountain in South West Tasmania named after aviator and adventurer, Lloyd Lindsay Jones MBE (1916–2004).  It lies on the South East end of the Frankland Range jutting out towards the east from the range towards the impoundment Lake Pedder.  It is west of the end of the ridge line leading to the edge of Lake Pedder at Terminal Peak and North East of Secheron Peak.

See also
 Lake Pedder
 Strathgordon, Tasmania
 South West Wilderness, Tasmania

References
 Solitary 4224, Edition 1 2001, Tasmania 1:25000 Series, Tasmap

Lloyd Jones
South West Tasmania